Joaquin Antonio Gonzalez (born September 7, 1979) is a former professional National Football League offensive tackle for the Cleveland Browns and the Indianapolis Colts. He was drafted in the seventh round of the 2002 NFL Draft.

In college, he played alongside Bryant McKinnie on the offensive line, protecting for quarterback Ken Dorsey during the Miami Hurricanes' national championship season in 2001. Gonzalez was named first-team All-American in 2000 and 2001.

High school years
Gonzalez attended Columbus High School in Miami, Florida, and was a student, a letterman in football and track and field, and as a senior, he was also named Columbus' Student Athlete of the Year and was a recipient of the President's Education Award. In football, as a senior, he was named as his team's Most Valuable Offensive Lineman and was an Honorable Mention All-Dade County selection. Gonzalez graduated from Columbus High School in 1997.

References

External links
NFL.com player page

1979 births
Living people
Christopher Columbus High School (Miami-Dade County, Florida) alumni
American football offensive tackles
Miami Hurricanes football players
Cleveland Browns players
Indianapolis Colts players
Players of American football from Miami
William V. Campbell Trophy winners